St Mary's Church is a Conservative Evangelical Church of England parish church in the centre of Maidenhead, England.  It has a congregation of mixed ages and backgrounds.  The church aims "to know Jesus and make Jesus known."

Buildings
There are several buildings on the St Mary's Church site.  There is the church itself, the church halls, the 'Old Vic' (the vicarage from 1950 to 1992), the chapel and the Old Vic garden.

St Mary's Church has been rebuilt three times.  Currently it is the fourth St Mary's Church.  The fourth church was constructed in 1965.  The spire is made of fibreglass and had to be hoisted into position by a crane. It had a major refurbishment starting in 2016, completing in 2018.

Staff
The church is currently in interregnum following the departure of the previous vicar, Revd Will Stileman, to All Souls Church, Langham Place. The church employs an associate minister, the Revd Jon Drake, and a curate, the Revd Ian Miller. In addition to the clergy, the church employs other ministry and administrative staff.

St Mary’s is a conservative evangelical parish that receives alternative episcopal oversight from the Bishop of Maidstone (currently Rod Thomas).

References

External links
St Mary's Church web site
Map sources - 

Maidenhead, St Mary's church
Conservative evangelical Anglican churches in England receiving AEO